Energeticism is the physical view that energy is the fundamental element in all physical change. It posits a specific ontology, or a philosophy of being, which holds that all things are ultimately composed of energy, and which is opposed to ontological idealism. Energeticism might be associated with the physicist and philosopher Ernst Mach, though his attitude to it is ambiguous. It was also propounded by the chemist Wilhelm Ostwald.

Energeticism is largely rejected today, in part due to its Aristotelian and metaphysical leanings and its rejection of the existence of a micro-world (such as the one that chemists or physicists have discovered). Ludwig Boltzmann and Max Planck posited that matter and energy are distinct from each other and, hence, that energy cannot itself be the fundamental unit of nature upon which all other units are based.

References

See also 
 Mass–energy equivalence
 Stationary-action principle

Ontology